Billy Jenkins (born 5 July 1956) is an English blues guitarist, composer and bandleader. He was born in Bromley, Kent, England.

Jenkins was a member of Burlesque, then Trimmer & Jenkins. After a short period, he was a member of Ginger Baker's Nutters. For several years, he ran Wood Wharf Studios. He worked on his own VOTP Records label and led the Voice of God Collective, a group which included Iain Ballamy, Django Bates, Steve Watts, Ashley Slater and other members of the group Loose Tubes. The band released several albums, including Sounds Like Bromley and Uncommerciality.

In the 1990s, Jenkins recorded several albums on Oliver Weindling's Babel Records, and led some seasons at the Vortex Jazz Club. He is now best known as a blues guitarist. Until 2009, Jenkins was captain of Francis Drake bowls club on Hilly Fields, Lewisham. He masterminded a successful season of live music to accompany the 2006 FIFA World Cup at the Vortex Jazz Club.

In the mid-1990s, Jenkins and his band The Blues Collective, took part in a parody documentary entitled Virus Called The Blues, produced and directed by Craig Duncan.

Discography
Studio albums
 Sounds Like Bromley (1982)
 Greenwich (1985)
 Uncommerciality Vol 1 (1986)
 Scratches of Spain (Babel, 1987)
 Wiesen (1987)
 Round Midnight Cowboy (1988)
 In the Nude: Standards, Vol. 1 (1988)
 In the Nude (1988)
 Motorway At Night (1988)
 Uncommerciality Vol 2 (1988)
 Blue Moon in a Function Room (1990)
 Entertainment USA (1994)
 East West (1996)
S.A.D (1996)
Still Sounds Like Bromley (1997)
True Love Collection (1999)
Suburbia (1999)
Blues Zero 2 (2002)
When the Crowds Have Gone (2004)
Born Again (And the Religion is the Blues) (2010)

Live albums
 Jazz Cafe Concerts Vol 1 (1989)
 Jazz Cafe Concerts Vol 2 (1989)
 Billy Jenkins / Fun Horns: Mayfest ‘94 (1995)
 Billy Jenkins / Fun Horns: East / West (1996)
Songs of Praise Live (2007)

Compilation albums
First Aural Art Exhibition (2006)

See also
 The Oxcentrics

References

External links
 Billy Jenkins website
 Billy Jenkins' MySpace page
 Babel Label website
 Vortex website

1956 births
Living people
English blues guitarists
English jazz guitarists
English male guitarists
British male jazz musicians
Voice of God Collective members
Oxcentrics members